The 1928–29 season was the club's 10th official season and their 26th year in existence. Beşiktaş finished 3rd, behind Fenerbahçe and Galatasaray. In the Turkish Football Championship, they failed to reach the final.

External links
Turkish Soccer

Beşiktaş J.K. seasons
Besiktas